DW7 may refer to:
Dragon Warrior VII
Dynasty Warriors 7